Sabá is a town, with a population of 16,460 (2020 calculation), and a municipality in the Honduran department of Colón.

Sports
The local football club, Unión Sabá, play in the Honduran second division. They play at the Estadio Municipal.

References 

Municipalities of the Colón Department (Honduras)